Neocrinus is a genus of crinoids in the family Isocrinidae, that contains only two known species. Members of this genus appeared on Earth 23.03 million years ago in the Miocene Epoch.

Species
 Neocrinus blakei (Carpenter, 1884)
 Neocrinus decorus (Thomson, 1864)

References

Isocrinidae
Crinoid genera